Canadian DJ and producer A-Trak has released seven full-length DJ mixtapes, one EP, and dozens of singles of original music as a solo artist; he has remixed hundreds of tracks as a DJ. A collaborator since the beginning of his career, A-Trak has focused on co-producing music with other artists since the early 2000s and has been part of musical groups The Brothers Macklovitch (2020–present), Duck Sauce (2009–present), Low Pros (2014), DJ crew The Allies (1998–2000), and hip hop crew Obscure Disorder (1997–2000).

Charting records

Charted albums

Charted singles

As lead artist

As featured artist

Albums

As solo artist (DJ mixes) 
Oh No You Didn't: Live in Vancouver – Disque Primeur (2006)
Sunglasses Is A Must – Audio Research (2006)
Dirty South Dance – Obey Records (2007)
Running Man: Nike+ Original Run – Nike+ Sport Music (2008)
 Infinity + 1 – Thrive Records (2009)
FabricLive.45 – Fabric Records (2009)
Dirty South Dance 2 – Fool's Gold (2010)

As part of Obscure Disorder 
 Full Circle: 1997-2002 Retrospective – Audio Research (2018) (compilation)

As part of The Allies 
 D-Day – Asphodel (2000)

As part of Duck Sauce 
 Quack – Fool's Gold (2014)

Extended plays

As solo artist 
Tuna Melt EP – Fool's Gold (2012)

As part of Low Pros 
 Low Pros – Fool's Gold (2014)

As part of Duck Sauce 
Greatest Hits – Fool's Gold (2009)
Duck Droppings – self-released (2014)

Singles

As solo artist 
 "Umbilical Chord" – London/FFFR (1999)
 "Enter Ralph Wiggum" – Stones Throw (1999) [7"]
 "All Hail To My Hands" – Asphodel (2000)
 "Gangsta Breaks" –Ammo (2001) [12"]
 "Monkeyboy Breaks" – Ammo (2003) [12"]
 "Don't Fool With The Dips" featuring J.R. Writer, Hell Rell and 40 Cal. – Audio Research (2005) [12"]
 "Sunglasses Is A Must" – Smelly Fatso/Monkey Studies Records (2006) [12"]
 "Step Off" featuring Little Brother – Audio Research (2006) [12"]
 "Knucklehead" – Audio Research (2006) [7"]
 "Quitte La Piste" featuring TTC – (2006)
 "Mastered (Me & My Sneakers)" featuring Lupe Fiasco – Nike+ (2007)
 "Running Man"–  Nike+ (2007)
 "Say Whoa" – Kitsuné (2007) [12"]
"Ray Ban Vision" featuring CyHi Da Prince – Fool's Gold (2010)
"Piss Test" featuring Juicy J and Danny Brown – Fool's Gold (2012)
"Piss Test Remix" featuring Juicy J, Jim Jones, Flatbush Zombies, El-P, and Flosstradamus – Fool's Gold (2013) [Label Compilation]
"Out the Speakers" featuring Rich Kidz – Green Label Sound (2015)
 "Ibanez" featuring Cory Enemy and Nico Stadi – Spinnin' Records (2015)
"Push" featuring Andrew Wyatt – Fool's Gold (2015)
 "We All Fall Down" featuring Jamie Lidell – Fool's Gold (2015)
"Parallel Lines" featuring Phantogram – Fool's Gold (2016)
"Believe" featuring Quavo and Lil Yachty – Fool's Gold (2017)
"Work It Out" – Fool's Gold (2019)
"What Can I Do" featuring Loods – Fool's Gold (2019)
"Blaze" with Friend Within – Fool's Gold (2019)

As collaborative artist 
 with Herve: "Roll With The Winners" – Cheap Thrills (2008)
 with Laidback Luke: "Shake It Down" – Fool's Gold/Mixmash (2008)
with Zinc: "Like The Dancefloor" featuring Natalie Storm – Rinse (2008)
 with Zinc: "Stingray"  – Fool's Gold (2011)
 with Mark Foster and Kimbra: "Warrior" – Converse (2012)
 with Dillon Francis: "Money Makin'"– Fool's Gold (2012)
 with GTA : "Landlines 2.0" – Fool's Gold (2013)
with Laidback Luke: "Shake It Down" – Fool's Gold (2013)
with Oliver: "Zamboni" – Fool's Gold (2013)
with Cam'ron and Federal Reserve: "Dipshi*ts" featuring Juelz Santana – Federal Reserve (2014)
 with ZHU and Keznamdi: "As Crazy As It Is" – Columbia Records (2015)
 with Zoofunktion: "Place on Earth" – Spinnin' Records (2015)
 with Tommy Trash: "Lose My Mind" – Fool's Gold (2016)
with Baauer: "Fern Gully" b/w "Dumbo Drop" – Fool's Gold (2017)
 with Falcons: "Ride for Me" featuring Young Thug and 24hrs – Fool's Gold (2018)
 with Yehme2: "Prayer Hands" – Fool's Gold (2018)
 with Todd Terry: "DJs Gotta Dance More" – Fool's Gold (2018)
 with Ferreck Dawn: "Coming Home" – Club Sweat (2020)
 with Ferreck Dawn: "My Own Way" – Fool's Gold Records (2021)
 with Wongo (music producer) featuring Ladybug Mecca: "Querida" – Fool's Gold Records (2021)

As part of Obscure Disorder 
 "Lyrically Exposed" – Audio Research (1997)
 "Maintain the Focus" b/w "Small Talk" – Audio Research (1998)
 "2004" b/w "The Entree" – Audio Research (1999)
 "The Grill" b/w "Like" – Audio Research (2002)

As part of Duck Sauce 
 "aNYway" – Ministry of Sound/Fool's Gold (2009)
"Barbra Streisand" – 3Beat/Downtown/Fool's Gold (2010)
 "Big Bad Wolf" – Big Beat (2011)
 "Radio Stereo" – Duck Sauce/Universal (2013)
 "It's You"  – Duck Sauce/Universal (2013)
 "NRG" – Fool's Gold (2014)
 "Ring Me" – Fool's Gold (2014)
 "Get to Steppin" b/w "Smiley Face – Duck Sauce (2020)
 "Captain Duck" b/w/ "I Don't Mind" – Duck Sauce (2020)

As part of The Brothers Macklovitch 
 "Give Love to Get Some" – Fool's Gold (2020)
 "I Can Call You" feat. Leven Kali – Fool's Gold (2020)

As featured artist 
 with Gidas and Masaya: "Like Woah" Alex Gopher Edit – Kitsuné (2008)
 with Lifelik: "Don't Stop" – Kitsuné (2012)
 with Madeaux: "Lost in Translation" – Fool's Gold (2015)
 with ZHU: "As Crazy As It Is" – Columbia (2015)
 with Wolfgang Garter: "Up in Smoke" also featuring Jesse Boykins III – Armada Music (2016)
 with Tommy Trash: "Lover" – Fool's Gold (2016)
 with Calvin Harris: "Prayer's Up" also featuring Travis Scott – Sony (2017)
 with The Cool Kids: "T.D.A." also featuring Reese LAFLARE and Larry June – Propelr Music (2017)
 with Injury Reserve: "Koruna & Lime" – Seneca Village Recordings (2019)
 with Common: "Leaders (Crib Love)" – Common (2019)
 with Travis Thompson: "Don't Run" – Epic Records/Sony (2019)

Remix discography

Compilations 
 In the Loop: A Decade of Remixes – Fool's Gold (2016)

Singles 
Non-exhaustive discography

D-Styles – "Felonious Funk" (2003)
Bonde Do Role – "Melo Do Tabaco" (2006)
Architecture In Helsinki – "Heart It Races" (2007)
Bumblebeez – "Dr. Love" (2007)
Scanners – "Bombs" (2007)
James Pants – "Kash" (2007)
Simian Mobile Disco – "Hustler" (2007)
Digitalism – "Idealistic" (2007)
Kanye West – "Stronger" (2008)
Boys Noize – "Oh!" (2008)
Count & Sinden – "Beeper" (2008)
Daft Punk – "Robot Rock" (2009)
MSTRKRFT featuring NORE – "Bounce" (2009)
Sébastien Tellier – "Kilometer" (2009)
Yeah Yeah Yeahs – "Heads Will Roll" (2009)
Justice – "D.A.N.C.E." (2010) (from "DJ Hero 2")
Tiga – "What You Need" (2010)
Robyn – "Indestructible" (2010)
DJ Sneak – "U Can't Hide From Your Bud" (2010)
The Rapture – "How Deep Is Your Love" (2011)
Laidback Luke and Sander Van Doorn – "Who's Wearing The Cap" (2011)
Martin Solveig – "The Night Out" (2012)
Martin Solveig – "The Night Out" with Martin Solveig (2012)
Surkin – "Never Let Go" (2012)
Justice – "New Lands" (2012)
Zedd – "Spectrum" with Clockwork (2012)
Cerrone – "Misunderstanding" with Codes (2012)
Kavinsky — Odd Look (2013)
Phoenix – "Trying to Be Cool"  (2013)
Jack Beats – "Just A Beat" (2013)
Alesso featuring Roy English – "Cool" (2014)
The Chainsmokers featuring Great Good Fine Ok – "Let You Go" (2015)
Disclosure featuring  Lorde – "Magnets" (2015)
Bob Moses – "Tearing Me Up" – Domino (2016)
Dillon Francis – "Anywhere" (2016)
Maroon 5 featuring SZA – "What Lovers Do" (2017)
Charlotte Gainsbourg – "Sylvia Says" (2018)
Ferreck Dawn and Robosonic -–"In Arms" (2018)
ABBA – "Voulez-Vous" (2018)
Showtek — "Listen To Your Momma" (2019)
Axwell — "Nobody Else" (2019)
The Magician — "Ready to Love" (2019)
Phantoms featuring Anna Clendening – "Say It" (2019)
Weiss and Harry Romero - "Where Do We Go?" (2020)

Production discography 
Selected discography
 "Overdose Music" by Obscure Disorder – Audio Research (2000)
"All Hail To My Hands" by The Allies – Asphodel (2000)
"The Grill" by Obscure Disorder – Audio Research (2000)
"Felonius Funk" b/w "The Murder Faktory by D-Styles – Audio Research (2002)
"Gold Digger" Kanye West featuring Jamie Foxx – Roc-A-Fella Records (2005)
"Chi State of Mind" by GLC – GOOD Music (2006)
 "Regarde-Les" by Dabaaz – Disque Primeur (2006)
"Stronger" by Kanye West – Roc-A-Fella Records (2007)
"Damn Girl" by Kid Sister – Fool's Gold (2007)
"Pro Nails" by Kid Sister – Fool's Gold (2007)
 "RoboCop" by Kanye West – Roc-A-Fella Records (2008)
 "Get Fresh" with XXXChange by Kid Sister – Downtown (2008)
 "You Ain't Really Down" by Kid Sister – Downtown (2009)
 "H Town" with Oligee by Dizzee Rascal – Dirtee Stank (2012)
 "Smokin & Drinkin" with JMIKE by Danny Brown – Fool's Gold (2013)
"Champions" with Lex Luger by Kanye West, Travis Scott, Big Sean, Desiigner, Quavo, 2 Chainz, Gucci Mane – (2016)
 "Kitana" with Lex Luger by Princess Nokia – Rough Trade (2017)

 "Adlibbin’ Crazy" with Danny Brown by Index (Inhansed & Nick XL) – (2018)

Credits for scratches 
 "Lyrically Exposed" by Obscure Disorder (1997)
"Soul Pleureur (Part 2)" by Dubmatique (1997)
"Tale of Five Cities" by Peanut Butter Wolf (1998) (with others)
"Think Twice" by Shades of Culture (1998)
"Do The Math" by D-Shade (1998)
"Maintain the Focus" & "Small Talk" by Obscure Disorder (1998)
"Superior Raps" featuring Obscure Disorder by Hundred Strong (1999)
"2004,"The Entree," & "Full Circle" by Obscure Disorder (1999)
"Les Rues Sont Énervées" by Yvon Krevé (2000)
"All Hail To My Hands" by The Allies (2000)
"Mindblowin" by Troy Dunnit (2001)
"Cult Leader" by Non Phixion (2002)
 "Go!" by Common by Geffen (2005)
"Gold Digger" by Kanye West – Roc-A-Fella/Def Jam (2005)
 "Do What You Do" by Consequence (2006)
"Regardes-Les" by Dabazz (2007)
"Contol" by Kid Sister (2009)
"Make Her Say" by Kid Cudi featuring Kanye West & Common (2009)
"Show Me A Good Time" by Drake (2010)
"Side A (Old)" by Danny Brown (2013)
"Acceptance Speech" by Ill Bill (2013)
"Prayers Up" by Calvin Harris (2017)

References 

Discographies of Canadian artists
Electronic music discographies